Wynton or Winton is a masculine given name. Notable people with the name include:

Wynton Bernard (born 1990), American baseball player
Wynton Hall, American non-fiction writer and journalist
Winton C. Hoch (1905–1979), American cinematographer
Wynton Kelly (1931–1971), American jazz pianist
Wynton Marsalis (born 1961), American trumpeter, composer, bandleader and music educator
Winton Pickering (born 1962), Cook Islands politician
Wynton Rufer, CNZM, (born 1962), New Zealand retired footballer
Winton Turnbull (1899–1980), Australian politician
Winton A. Winter Sr. (1930–2013), American politician

English-language masculine given names